Utku Ünal is a Turkish musician.

After having graduated from the Middle East Technical University (METU) in 1995, Ünal decided to pursue his career in the field of music.

Between 2006-2007, Ünal completed his Master’s thesis on Analysis of usage of 5 and 10 timed Rhythms in the Southeastern Anatolian Region and has since continued his academic career as an instructor to various private education institutions. Amongst the private education institutions that he has worked with are Robert College, ENKA, Ulus Private Jewish Schools and Hisar Schools.

Utku Ünal is married to Gülin Terek Ünal and is the father of a daughter, Cemre.

References 

Year of birth missing (living people)
Living people
Turkish musicians
Middle East Technical University alumni